ZHR may represent:
Zenithal Hourly Rate, an astronomical term
Związek Harcerstwa Rzeczypospolitej, a Polish Scout organisation